Mr. George may refer to:
Mr. George (group), an Australian musical group, formed in 1973
Pen name for Georg Svendsen
Publix Super Markets, Inc. founder George W. Jenkins
Character in Mr Don & Mr George
Character in Mr. George and Other Odd Persons